Mazhayathu is a 2018 Indian Malayalam-language coming of age family drama film written and directed by Suveeran. Produced under the banner Spellbound Films Inc. The film features an ensemble cast consisting of Nikesh Ram, Aparna Gopinath, Nandhana Varma, Shanthi Krishna, Manoj K Jayan, Sunil Sukhada, Santhosh Keezhattoor, Nandhu, Sivaji Guruvayoor, Sreeya Remesh and Reshmi Boban.

Plot 
The story revolves around a Malayali middle-class family consists of Venugopal, Anitha, and their daughter Sreelakshmi alias Ummi. The couple, Venugopal and Anita, though there are usual tiffs between the husband and the wife, lead a healthy family life. Anita strives to be independent and tries to find a job for herself to be so. Venugopal is a government employee. Venugopal's love for his daughter Ummi knows no bounds. As far as Ummi is concerned she needs her father's help for every single thing she does.
One day, an incident shakes the whole family and the happy life ends. Venugopal fails to make out the reason for people's angry reactions on seeing him. He is thunder struck on realizing the reason for the reaction of the people. The present day news stories appear in different media in Kerala which are replete with related cases add which fueling to spreading rumours.

Cast 

Nikesh Ram as Venugopal
Aparna Gopinath as Anitha
Nandhana Varma as Sreelakshmi alias Ummi
Manoj K Jayan as Police Circle Inspector
Sunil Sukhada as Police Constable
Shanthi Krishna as School Principal Anamika
Reshmi Boban as Lissy Miss
Santhosh Keezhattoor as Venugopal's Friend
Sivaji Guruvayoor as School Manager
Nandhu as Venugopal's Friend Narayenettan
Sreeya Remesh as Anitha's Friend Suma Aunty

Production

Development 
After the film Athithi in Tamil, this is the second movie under production by Spellbound Films Inc. Their third movie is under production simultaneously in Tamil titled "MichaelPatty Rasavum Dubai Rosavum", which is ready to release in May 2018.

Filming 
The filming of Mazhayathu started on 30 August 2017 in a village named Kuttiady in Vadakara. The shoot went on for 30days in Vadakara and then the crew moved to Kannur district to complete the later part. In Kannur the shoot went on for 15days and few scenes were shot in Ernakulam and Chennai. Then the post production work started by end of November, 2017.

Music 
The soundtrack features two songs composed by Gopi Sunder.  The Audio was released on 16 April 2018 in Crowne Plaza Hotel Dubai.

Track list

Release 
The film was released on 25 May 2018 The film received mixed reviews.

Critical reception 
Times of India Rating 3/5
Book my show users have reviews as four stars where critics reviewed it for 3stars and 69% likings towards the movie IMDB rated the movie with 7.3stars

Awards and nominations

References 

2018 films
2010s Malayalam-language films
Indian drama films
2018 drama films